Fidor Bank is a German online bank, founded in 2009. In 2015, it started a market foray into the UK.

In July 2016, it was announced that Fidor Bank was being acquired by France's Groupe BPCE for €100m. As of September 2016, Fidor Bank continued to operate under its own branding.

On 1 July 2019 Fidor Bank announced that it would suspend its services in the UK on 15 September 2019 owing to uncertainties about the UK market.

References 

Online banks
Banks of Germany
Financial services companies based in Munich
2016 mergers and acquisitions